Amna Malik (née Butt) is a Pakistani actress and model. She is known for her roles in dramas Bebaak, Deewar-e-Shab, Khaas and Laapata.

Early life 
She worked as a teacher for 7 years at Karachi City School and use to teach junior grades.

Career 
Amna started working as a host on Capital TV in 2015. She made her debut as an actress in 2016 in telefilm Gudgudee as Sara which was directed by Hina Dilpazeer. Then she appeared in dramas Naik Parveen, Saanp Seerhi, Dikhawa Season 2 and Naqab Zan. She also appeared in dramas Deewar-e-Shab, Soteli Maamta, Kitni Girhain Baaki Hain season 2 and Khaas Since then she appeared in dramas Bebaak, Maa Sadqay, Laapata and Taqdeer.

Personal life 
She is married and she has two daughters.

Filmography

Television

Anthology Series

Telefilm

Host

Other appearance

References

External links
 

1987 births
Living people
Pakistani television actresses
21st-century Pakistani actresses